Rafael Estevão "Rafa" Hettsheimeir (born June 16, 1986) is a Brazilian-Spanish professional basketball player who currently plays for Flamengo in the Novo Basquete Brasil (NBB) and the BCL Americas. He was also member of the Brazilian national basketball team.

Professional career
Hettsheimeir started his senior career in Brazil with Ribeirão Preto, with whom he played from 2003 to 2005. In 2006, he moved to Spain and signed with Akasvayu Vic of the LEB Plata. After two seasons with Vic, he moved to Plus Pujol Lleida of the LEB Oro where he stayed for two seasons.

In the summer of 2009, Hettsheimeir signed with CAI Zaragoza. On November 13, 2009, he was loaned to Obradoiro CAB for three months. On February 11, 2010, he returned to CAI Zaragoza. On May 27, 2010, he signed a new two-year contract with Zaragoza.

On October 30, 2012, Hettsheimeir signed with Real Madrid. With Real he won the 2012–13 ACB championship. After one season, he parted ways with Real. On August 15, 2013, Hettsheimeir signed a two-year deal with Unicaja. After one season, he left Unicaja and returned to Brazil where he signed with Bauru.

On January 26, 2017, Hettsheimeir signed with Montakit Fuenlabrada for the rest of the 2016–17 ACB season. In June 2017, he signed with Santeros de Aguada of the Baloncesto Superior Nacional.

After a couple of seasons playing in Franca, Rafael signed Flamengo Basket for NBB and FIBA America League.

National team career
As a member of the Brazilian national basketball team he won the gold medal at the 2005 FIBA Americas Championship. He also won a silver medal at the 2011 FIBA Americas Championship.

Career statistics

NBB regular season

NBB playoffs

References

External links

Rafael Hettsheimeir at acb.com 
Rafael Hettsheimeir at archive.fiba.com
Rafael Hettsheimeir at euroleague.net
Rafael Hettsheimeir at latinbasket.com
Rafael Hettsheimeir at lnb.com  

1986 births
Living people
2014 FIBA Basketball World Cup players
Associação Bauru Basketball players
Baloncesto Fuenlabrada players
Baloncesto Málaga players
Basketball players at the 2015 Pan American Games
Basketball players at the 2016 Summer Olympics
Basket Zaragoza players
Brazilian expatriate basketball people
Brazilian expatriate basketball people in Spain
Brazilian men's basketball players
Brazilian people of German descent
CB Vic players
Centers (basketball)
Flamengo basketball players
Franca Basquetebol Clube players
Liga ACB players
Naturalised citizens of Spain
Novo Basquete Brasil players
Obradoiro CAB players
Olympic basketball players of Brazil
Pan American Games gold medalists for Brazil
Pan American Games medalists in basketball
People from Araçatuba
Power forwards (basketball)
Real Madrid Baloncesto players
Santeros de Aguada basketball players
Spanish men's basketball players
Medalists at the 2015 Pan American Games
Sportspeople from São Paulo (state)